Teran Williams (born 20 November 1984) is an Antiguan footballer who plays for Antigua Barracuda FC in the USL Professional Division.

Club career
Williams began his professional career in 2004 with Bassa in the Antigua and Barbuda Premier Division, before moving to SAP FC in 2007. He was part of the Bassa team which won the Antigua and Barbuda Premier Division title in 2004–05, and later helped SAP to the Premier Division-Antigua and Barbuda FA Cup double in 2008–09.

In 2011, Williams transferred to the new Antigua Barracuda FC team prior to its first season in the USL Professional Division.

International career
Williams made his debut for Antigua and Barbuda in a November 2004 CONCACAF Gold Cup qualification match against Saint Lucia and has earned nearly 20 caps since. He played in all four of Antigua's qualification games for the 2010 FIFA World Cup, and was one of Antigua's goal scorers in the 4–3 loss to Cuba on 17 June 2008.

International goals
Scores and results list Antigua and Barbuda's goal tally first.

References

External links
 

1984 births
Living people
Antigua and Barbuda footballers
Antigua and Barbuda international footballers
Association football midfielders
SAP F.C. players
Antigua Barracuda F.C. players